The 1996 UEFA Super Cup was a two-legged match that took place on 15 January 1997 and 5 February 1997 between Paris Saint-Germain of France, champions of the 1995–96 UEFA Cup Winners' Cup, and Juventus of Italy as winners of the 1995–96 UEFA Champions League. Juventus won the tie 9–2 on aggregate (a record margin in the history of the cup), humiliating PSG at the Parc des Princes 6–1, with goals from Sergio Porrini, Michele Padovano, Ciro Ferrara, Attilio Lombardo and Nicola Amoruso in the first leg (also a record) and winning the second leg 3–1 at Stadio La Favorita in Palermo after goals from Alessandro Del Piero and Christian Vieri.

As in the 1994–95 UEFA Cup, Juventus chose to play their home leg away from Turin due to poor attendances at the Stadio delle Alpi, in contrast to the big crowds they attracted playing in other cities.

Match details

First leg

Second leg

See also
1995–96 UEFA Champions League
1995–96 UEFA Cup Winners' Cup
Juventus F.C. in European football
Paris Saint-Germain F.C. in European football

References

External links
1996 UEFA Super Cup at Rec.Sport.Soccer Statistics Foundation

Super Cup
1996
Super Cup 1996
Super Cup 1996
Super Cup 1996
Super Cup 1996
January 1997 sports events in Europe
February 1997 sports events in Europe
Sport in Palermo
1997 in Paris